Kostomlaty may refer to the following locations in the Czech Republic:
 Kostomlaty nad Labem, a village in Nymburk District
 Kostomlaty pod Milešovkou, a village in Teplice District
 Kostomlaty pod Řípem, a village in Litoměřice District